Under Arizona Skies is a 1946 American Western film directed by Lambert Hillyer and written by J. Benton Cheney. The film stars Johnny Mack Brown, Reno Browne, Raymond Hatton, Riley Hill, Tris Coffin and Reed Howes. The film was released on May 27, 1946, by Monogram Pictures.

Plot

Cast           
Johnny Mack Brown as Dusty Smith
Reno Browne as Cindy Rigby 
Raymond Hatton as Santa Fe Jones
Riley Hill as Bill Simpson
Tris Coffin as Blackie Evans
Reed Howes as Duke
Ted Adams as John Carter
Ray Bennett as Tom Sloan
Frank LaRue as Jim Simpson
Steve Clark as Sam Stewart
Jack Rockwell as Sheriff John Rigby
Bud Geary as Chuck Gilmore
Ted Mapes as Red Connors
Dusty Rhodes as Slim
Kermit Maynard as Joe Forbes
Smith Ballew as Band Singer

References

External links
 

1946 films
American Western (genre) films
1946 Western (genre) films
Monogram Pictures films
Films directed by Lambert Hillyer
American black-and-white films
1940s English-language films
1940s American films